This list indicates government departments in various countries dedicated to public works or infrastructure.

See also 
 Public works
 Ministry or Board of Public Works, the imperial Chinese ministry overseeing public projects from the Tang dynasty to the Qing
 Ministry of Works (disambiguation)

 
Public works